The Cheddikulam massacre was a massacre of Sri Lankan Tamil civilians in the village of Cheddikulam, located on the border of the Vavuniya and Mannar districts. It was among the first of the series of massacres carried out by the Sri Lankan armed forces during the country's Civil War.

Massacre
On December 2, 1984, the Sri Lankan military imposed a curfew throughout Cheddikulam and the adjoining villages and towns. The military began cordoning off the village at 5.30 a.m. Most of its inhabitants were still asleep, when armed personnel entered the village and took away the males of the village for 'inquiries'.

52 men were reportedly bundled into military vehicles, and taken to the Anuradhapura District and killed. The locals allege that the 52 men were taken to a Sinhalese settlement near Medawachchiya, and were chopped up with sharp knives and later heavy vehicles were run over them. As a result, the villagers say all the 52 men died.

Witness Accounts
T Yesuthasan, teacher at Cheddikulam Mahavidyalayam, says,

Another resident Mayilvahanam says,

References

Massacres in 1984
Attacks on civilians attributed to the Sri Lanka Army
Cheddikulam
Massacres in Sri Lanka
December 1984 events in Asia
Mass murder of Sri Lankan Tamils
Massacres of men
Sri Lankan government forces attacks in Eelam War I
Terrorist incidents in Sri Lanka in 1984
Violence against men in Asia